Samalie Matovu is a Ugandan musician. She won Diva Awards 2010, New Artist of the Year and Song of the Year, and Pam awards song of the year 2010.

References

Living people
21st-century Ugandan women singers
Year of birth missing (living people)
Place of birth missing (living people)